The Camille Dreyfus Teacher-Scholar Awards are awards given to early-career researchers in chemistry by The Camille and Henry Dreyfus Foundation, Inc. "to support the research and teaching careers of talented young faculty in the chemical sciences." The Dreyfus Teacher-Scholar program began in 1970. In 1994, the program was divided into two parallel awards: The Camille Dreyfus Teacher-Scholar Awards Program, aimed at research universities, and the Henry Dreyfus Teacher-Scholar Awards Program, directed at primarily undergraduate institutions. This list compiles all the pre-1994 Teacher-Scholars, and the subsequent Camille Dreyfus Teacher-Scholars.

The annually presented awards consist of a monetary prize of $75,000, which was increased to $100,000 starting in 2019. Seven winners of the Camille Dreyfus Teacher-Scholar Awards have gone on to win the Nobel Prize in Chemistry, including Paul L. Modrich, Richard R. Schrock, Robert H. Grubbs, K. Barry Sharpless, Ahmed H. Zewail, Mario J. Molina and Yuan Tseh Lee.

Recipients 
Source: Dreyfus Foundation

1970 

Robert G. Bergman, California Institute of Technology 
Bruce A. Cunningham, Rockefeller University
Richard D. Fink, Amherst College
Joseph N. Gayles, Jr., Morehouse College
O. Hayes Griffith, University of Oregon
Daniel S. Kemp, Massachusetts Institute of Technology
, Emory University
, The University of Chicago
John A. Osborn, Harvard University
Mitchel Shen, University of California, Berkeley 
Barry M. Trost, University of Wisconsin–Madison 
Richard A. Walton, Purdue University
F. Sheldon Wettack, Hope College
James T.  Yardley, University of Illinois at Urbana-Champaign

1971 

Jesse L. Beauchamp, California Institute of Technology
David A. Evans, University of California, Los Angeles
, University of California, Santa Barbara
Yuan T. Lee, The University of Chicago
Stephen J. Lippard, Columbia University
Kenneth G. Mann, University of Minnesota
J. David Puett, Vanderbilt University
Stanley I. Sandler, University of Delaware
Lothar Schäfer, University of Arkansas
, Massachusetts Institute of Technology
James Snyder, Yeshiva University
Leonard D. Spicer, The University of Utah
Leonard M. Stephenson, Stanford University
Edward I. Stiefel, Stony Brook University
John S. Swenton, Ohio State University
Claude H.  Yoder, Franklin & Marshall College

1972 

Jon Bordner, North Carolina State University
C. Hackett Bushweller, Worcester Polytechnic Institute
Jon Clardy, Iowa State University
Patricia A. Clark, Vassar College
Clark K.  Colton, Massachusetts Institute of Technology
Karl F. Freed, The University of Chicago
Robert M. Gavin, Haverford College
James F. Harrison, Michigan State University
David N. Hendrickson, University of Illinois at Urbana-Champaign
Kendall N. Houk, Louisiana State University
Arnold J. Levine, Princeton University
J. Michael McBride, Yale University
William R.  Moomaw, Williams College
William P.  Reinhardt, Harvard University
Frederick S.  Richardson, University of Virginia
John H. Seinfeld, California Institute of Technology
Frank A.  Weinhold, Stanford University

1973 

William H. Breckenridge, The University of Utah
Michael P. Doyle, Hope College
Irving R.  Epstein, Brandeis University
Martin Feinberg, University of Rochester
Frederick D. Lewis, Northwestern University
Richard Losick, Harvard University
William Hughes Miller, University of California, Berkeley
David L. Nelson, University of Wisconsin-Madison
David F.  Ollis, Princeton University
Michael R. Philpott, University of Oregon
Douglas Poland, Johns Hopkins University
David J. Prescott, Bryn Mawr College
Peter R. Rony, Virginia Polytechnic Institute and State University
Martin F. Semmelhack, Cornell University
K. Barry Sharpless, Massachusetts Institute of Technology
Robert W.  Vaughan, California Institute of Technology

1974 

, University of Washington
Jay Bailey, University of Houston
Robert D.  Bereman, State University of New York at Buffalo
Michael Berry, University of Wisconsin-Madison
Robert G. Bryant, University of Minnesota 
, University of Notre Dame
, Youngstown State University
Robert H. Grubbs, Michigan State University
Leroy E. Hood, California Institute of Technology
Bruce S.  Hudson, Stanford University
John Katzenellenbogen, University of Illinois at Urbana-Champaign
Denis A. Kohl, University of Texas at Austin
, University of California, Berkeley
Herschel Rabitz, Princeton University
Robert F.  Schleif, Brandeis University
Jeffrey Zink, University of California, Los Angeles

1975 

Larry R. Dalton, Vanderbilt University
Victor W. Day, University of Nebraska-Lincoln
Robert Ditchfield, Dartmouth College
Elvera Ehrenfeld, The University of Utah
Thomas F. George, University of Rochester
William C. Harris, Furman University
Wayne L. Hubbell, University of California, Berkeley
Marc W. Kirschner, Princeton University
Lynn C.  Klotz, Harvard University
L. Gary Leal, California Institute of Technology
W. Carl Lineberger, University of Colorado Boulder
Patrick S. Mariano, Texas A&M University
Tobin J. Marks, Northwestern University
James A. Spudich, University of California, San Francisco
Mark S. Wrighton, Massachusetts Institute of Technology

1976 

Ronald W. Davis, Stanford University
William M.  Gelbart, University of California, Los Angeles
George C.  Levy, Florida State University
Roger K. Murray, Jr., University of Delaware
Jack R. Norton, Princeton University
Larry E. Overman, University of California, Irvine
Alexander Pines, University of California, Berkeley
Christopher A. Reed, University of Southern California
Robert G. Roeder, Washington University in St. Louis
William H.  Scouten, Bucknell University
Barbara Ramsay Shaw, Duke University
John P. Simons, The University of Utah
Christopher T. Walsh, Massachusetts Institute of Technology
W. Henry Weinberg, California Institute of Technology
John R. Wiesenfeld, Cornell University

1977 

John E. Bercaw, California Institute of Technology
Robert E. Cohen, Massachusetts Institute of Technology
Paul J. Dagdigian, Johns Hopkins University
David Dressler, Harvard University
John R.  Eyler, University of Florida
Michael D. Fayer, Stanford University
Gregory L. Geoffroy, The Pennsylvania State University
Eric J. Heller, University of California, Los Angeles
Kenneth D. Jordan, Yale University
Harold L.  Kohn, University of Houston
Paul L. Modrich, Duke University
Mario J. Molina, University of California, Irvine
John S.  Olson, Rice University
Hong Yong Sohn, The University of Utah
George Stephanopoulos, University of Minnesota
Dwight A.  Sweigart, Swarthmore College

1978 

Peter B. Dervan, California Institute of Technology
David A.  Dixon, University of Minnesota
James A.  Dumesic, University of Wisconsin-Madison
William J. Evans, The University of Chicago
Bruce Ganem, Cornell University
William L. Jorgensen, Purdue University
Michael E. Jung, University of California, Los Angeles
Thomas F.  Keyes, Yale University
Daniel A.  Kleier, Williams College
Walter G.  Klemperer, Columbia University
Nancy H. Kolodny, Wellesley College
F. Raymond Salemme, University of Arizona
Richard R. Schrock, Massachusetts Institute of Technology
John R.  Shapley, University of Illinois at Urbana-Champaign
Amos B. Smith, III, University of Pennsylvania
K. Peter C. Vollhardt, University of California, Berkeley

1979 

Thomas A. Albright, University of Houston
Douglas L. Brutlag, Stanford University
Jeremy K.  Burdett, The University of Chicago
Malcolm H. Chisholm, Indiana University
Gary G.  Christoph, Ohio State University
Christos Georgakis, Massachusetts Institute of Technology
Christopher G. Goff, Haverford College
David R.  Herrick, University of Oregon
Philip M.  Keehn, Brandeis University
Nancy E.  Kleckner, Harvard University
George McLendon, University of Rochester
Horia Metiu, University of California, Santa Barbara
Kathlyn A. Parker, Brown University
Christian R. H. Raetz, University of Wisconsin-Madison
Gary B. Schuster, University of Illinois at Urbana-Champaign
Ahmed H. Zewail, California Institute of Technology

1980 

Bruce S. Ault, University of Cincinnati
Steven G. Boxer, Stanford University
Harry G.  Brittain, Seton Hall University
Chris K.  Chang, Michigan State University
Marye Anne Fox, University of Texas at Austin
John A. Gladysz, University of California, Los Angeles
Paul L. Houston, Cornell University
Joseph N. Kushick, Amherst College
Elias Lazarides, California Institute of Technology
Martin Newcomb, Texas A&M University
Kyriacos C. Nicolaou, University of Pennsylvania
David W. Oxtoby, The University of Chicago
Mary Fedarko Roberts, Massachusetts Institute of Technology
Matthew V. Tirrell, III, University of Minnesota
Paul A. Wender, Harvard University
Myung-Hwan Whangbo, North Carolina State University

1981 

Robert C. Aller, The University of Chicago
Alfons L.  Baumstark, Georgia State University
Lewis C. Cantley, Harvard University
John H. Clark, University of California, Berkeley
Robert H. Crabtree, Yale University
Richard G.  Finke, University of Oregon
Stephan S.  Isied, Rutgers, The State University of New Jersey
Alan P. Kozikowski, University of Pittsburgh
Dennis Liotta, Emory University
Gary L. Miessler, St. Olaf College
Glenn D.  Prestwich, Stony Brook University
Mary C.  Rakowski DuBois, University of Colorado Boulder
James E. Rothman, Stanford University
George C. Schatz, Northwestern University
Neil E. Schore, University of California, Davis
Costas G. Vayenas, Massachusetts Institute of Technology
Keith R.  Yamamoto, University of California, San Francisco

1982 

Alan Campion, University of Texas at Austin
F. Fleming Crim, University of Wisconsin-Madison
G. William Daub, Harvey Mudd College
John H. Dawson, University of South Carolina
Glenn T.  Evans, Oregon State University
Graham R. Fleming, The University of Chicago
Evan R.  Kantrowitz, Boston College
J. Andrew McCammon, University of Houston
C. William McCurdy, Ohio State University
Cheuk-Yiu Ng, Iowa State University
Maria C.  Pellegrini, University of Southern California
Kevin S. Peters, Harvard University
Thomas B.  Rauchfuss, University of Illinois at Urbana-Champaign
Barry B. Snider, Brandeis University
Gregory Stephanopoulos, California Institute of Technology

1983 

Robert A. Brown, Massachusetts Institute of Technology
Andrew E.  DePristo, Iowa State University
Kenneth C. Janda, California Institute of Technology
Frederick W. King, University of Wisconsin-Eau Claire
Branka M.  Ladanyi, Colorado State University
Shaul Mukamel, University of Rochester
Matthew S. Platz, Ohio State University
James P.  Reilly, Indiana University
Mark H. Thiemens, University of California, San Diego
Craig A. Townsend, Johns Hopkins University
Veronica Vaida, Harvard University
David M.  Walba, University of Colorado Boulder
R. Stanley Williams, University of California, Los Angeles

1984 

Bruce E. Bursten, Ohio State University
Dennis A. Dougherty, California Institute of Technology
Barbara J. Garrison, The Pennsylvania State University
Miklos Kertesz, Georgetown University
Bruce H. Lipshutz, University of California, Santa Barbara
David G.  Lynn, The University of Chicago
Alice C.  Mignerey, University of Maryland, College Park
Peter J.  Rossky, University of Texas at Austin
H. Bernard Schlegel, Wayne State University
Stuart L. Schreiber, Yale University
James L. Skinner, Columbia University
David S.  Soane, University of California, Berkeley

1985 

Krishnan Balasubramanian, Arizona State University
Gary W.  Brudvig, Yale University
Terrence J. Collins, California Institute of Technology
Dennis P. Curran, University of Pittsburgh
Klavs F. Jensen, University of Minnesota
William D. Jones, University of Rochester
Nathan S. Lewis, Stanford University
Lanny S.  Liebeskind, Emory University
David M.  Ronis, Harvard University
Ian P.  Rothwell, Purdue University
Ming-Daw Tsai, Ohio State University
Bonnie Ann Wallace, Columbia University

1986 

Jacqueline K. Barton, Columbia University
John F. Brady, California Institute of Technology
Sylvia T. Ceyer, Massachusetts Institute of Technology
Michael M.  Cox, University of Wisconsin-Madison
Richard A. Friesner, University of Texas at Austin
Jeffrey C. Kantor, University of Notre Dame
Marsha I. Lester, University of Pennsylvania
William J. McGinnis, Yale University
Geraldine L. Richmond, University of Oregon
Jasper Rine, University of California, Berkeley
Richard H. Scheller, Stanford University
Patricia A. Thiel, Iowa State University

1987 

Peter B. Armentrout, The University of Utah
Anthony G. M. Barrett, Northwestern University
Peter F. Bernath, University of Arizona
George Christou, Indiana University
Bruce Demple, Harvard University
Francois N. Diederich, University of California, Los Angeles
Gary P.  Drobny, University of Washington
Gregory S. Ezra, Cornell University
John W. Frost, Stanford University
Keith P.  Johnston, University of Texas at Austin
Kevin K. Lehmann, Princeton University
Jeffrey A.  Reimer, University of California, Berkeley

1988 

Donald R.  Bobbitt, University of Arkansas
Stephen L. Buchwald, Massachusetts Institute of Technology
Charles T.  Campbell, Indiana University
Ken Feldman, The Pennsylvania State University
Paul L.  Frattini, Carnegie Mellon University
Gregory S. Girolami, University of Illinois at Urbana-Champaign
Robert R.  Lucchese, Texas A&M University
R. J. Dwayne Miller, University of Rochester
Jonathan L. Sessler, University of Texas at Austin
Michael E.  Silver, Hope College
Angelica Stacy, University of California, Berkeley
Thomas D. Tullius, Johns Hopkins University
Daniel P. Weitekamp, California Institute of Technology
Kurt W. Zilm, Yale University

1989 

Scott L. Anderson, Stony Brook University
Laurie J. Butler, The University of Chicago
Rob D.  Coalson, University of Pittsburgh
Anthony W. Czarnik, Ohio State University
Hai-Lung Dai, University of Pennsylvania
Pablo G. Debenedetti, Princeton University
Andrew G.  Ewing, The Pennsylvania State University
Alice P. Gast, Stanford University
Marie E.  Krafft, Florida State University
Atsuo Kuki, Cornell University
Thomas E. Mallouk, University of Texas at Austin
John D. Simon, University of California, San Diego
Michael Trenary, University of Illinois at Chicago
Steven C. Zimmerman, University of Illinois at Urbana-Champaign

1990 

Peter Chen, Harvard University
Kim R.  Dunbar, Michigan State University
Juli F.  Feigon, University of California, Los Angeles
Joseph S. Francisco, Wayne State University
Mark A. Johnson, Yale University
Michael Kahn, University of Illinois at Chicago
Charles M. Lieber, Columbia University
Andrew G. Myers, California Institute of Technology
Scott D.  Rychnovsky, University of Minnesota
W. Mark Saltzman, Johns Hopkins University
Devarajan Thirumalai, University of Maryland, College Park
Nancy L. Thompson, The University of North Carolina at Chapel Hill

1991 

Victoria Buch, University of Illinois at Chicago
Jeffrey A. Cina, The University of Chicago
Ariel Fern‡ndez, University of Miami
Glenn H. Fredrickson, University of California, Santa Barbara
David E. Hansen, Amherst College
Joseph T. Hupp, Northwestern University
Richard B. Kaner, University of California, Los Angeles
Peter T.  Lansbury, Jr., Massachusetts Institute of Technology
Roger F.  Loring, Cornell University
Daniel M. Neumark, University of California, Berkeley
Gerard Parkin, Columbia University
Andrzej T. Rajca, Kansas State University

1992 

Patricia A. Bianconi, The Pennsylvania State University
Emily A. Carter, University of California, Los Angeles
Alan S. Goldman, Rutgers, The State University of New Jersey
Gerard S.  Harbison, University of Nebraska-Lincoln
W. Dean Harman, University of Virginia
Joel M. Hawkins, University of California, Berkeley
Eric N. Jacobsen, University of Illinois at Urbana-Champaign
Anne B.  Myers, University of Rochester
Gilbert M. Nathanson, University of Wisconsin-Madison
Athanassios Z. Panagiotopoulos, Cornell University
Gustavo E. Scuseria, Rice University
Gregory L. Verdine, Harvard University
Alec M. Wodtke, University of California, Santa Barbara

1993 

Jean S. Baum, Rutgers, The State University of New Jersey
Brian E. Bent, Columbia University
Jennifer S. Brodbelt, University of Texas at Austin
Robert J. Cave, Harvey Mudd College
Christopher E. D. Chidsey, Stanford University
Bradley F. Chmelka, University of California, Santa Barbara
David W. Christianson, University of Pennsylvania
William S. Hammack, Carnegie Mellon University
Mark J. Hampden-Smith, University of New Mexico
Barbara Imperiali, California Institute of Technology
Mercouri G. Kanatzidis, Michigan State University
Eric T. Kool, University of Rochester
Jane E. G. Lipson, Dartmouth College
Thomas V. O'Halloran, Northwestern University
Thomas C. Pochapsky, Brandeis University
Alanna Schepartz, Yale University
Athan J. Shaka, University of California, Irvine
L. Keith Woo, Iowa State University
Matthew B. Zimmt, Brown University

1994 

Eric V. Anslyn, University of Texas at Austin
Thomas P. Beebe, Jr., The University of Utah
Pamela J. Bjorkman, California Institute of Technology
Arup K. Chakraborty, University of California, Berkeley
James A. Cowan, Ohio State University
Amir H. Hoveyda, Boston College
Jeffery W. Kelly, Texas A&M University
Chi H. Mak, University of Southern California
Craig A. Merlic, University of California, Los Angeles
Jeffrey S. Moore, University of Illinois at Urbana-Champaign
Michael J. Sailor, University of California, San Diego
Eric S. G. Shaqfeh, Stanford University
Margaret A. Tolbert, University of Colorado Boulder
Patrick H. Vaccaro, Yale University
Gregory A. Voth, University of Pennsylvania
Theodore S. Widlanski, Indiana University

1995 

Gary D. Glick, University of Michigan
Brent L. Iverson, University of Texas at Austin
Robert J. Levis, Wayne State University
Gaetano T. Montelione, Rutgers, The State University of New Jersey
Reginald M. Penner, University of California, Irvine
Lynne Regan, Yale University
Lawrence R. Sita, The University of Chicago
Timothy M. Swager, University of Pennsylvania
H. Holden Thorp, The University of North Carolina at Chapel Hill
William B. Tolman, University of Minnesota
Eric J. Toone, Duke University
Zhen-Gang Wang, California Institute of Technology
James R. Williamson, Massachusetts Institute of Technology
Peter Wipf, University of Pittsburgh
Sarah A. Woodson, University of Maryland, College Park
John Z. H. Zhang, New York University

1996 

Guillermo C. Bazan, University of Rochester
D. Scott Bohle, University of Wyoming
Christopher N. Bowman, University of Colorado Boulder
Mark J. Burk, Duke University
Erick M. Carreira, California Institute of Technology
Robert E. Continetti, University of California, San Diego
Andrew D. Ellington, Indiana University
Lucio Frydman, University of Illinois at Chicago
John H. Griffin, Stanford University
Laura L. Kiessling, University of Wisconsin-Madison
Chad A. Mirkin, Northwestern University
Karin Musier-Forsyth, University of Minnesota
James S. Nowick, University of California, Irvine
Norbert F. Scherer, University of Pennsylvania
Jonathan V. Sweedler, University of Illinois at Urbana-Champaign
Susan C. Tucker, University of California, Davis
Jackie Y. Ying, Massachusetts Institute of Technology

1997 

Eray S. Aydil, University of California, Santa Barbara
Juan J. de Pablo, University of Wisconsin-Madison
Peter K. Dorhout, Colorado State University
Gregory C. Fu, Massachusetts Institute of Technology
Konstantinos P. Giapis, California Institute of Technology
Richard A. Goldstein, University of Michigan
John F. Hartwig, Yale University
Nancy Makri, University of Illinois at Urbana-Champaign
Frank E. McDonald, Northwestern University
Dale F. Mierke, Clark University
Karl T. Mueller, The Pennsylvania State University
Todd M. Przybycien, Rensselaer Polytechnic Institute
Vincent M. Rotello, University of Massachusetts Amherst
Igal Szleifer, Purdue University
Michael J. Therien, University of Pennsylvania
Ziling (Ben) Xue, The University of Tennessee

1998 

Nicholas L. Abbott, University of California, Davis
Nitash P. Balsara, Polytechnic University (New York)
Stacey F. Bent, New York University
Marcos Dantus, Michigan State University
Jeffery T. Davis, University of Maryland, College Park
P. Andrew Evans, University of Delaware
Ellen Fisher, Colorado State University
Clare P. Grey, Stony Brook University
Martin Gruebele, University of Illinois at Urbana-Champaign
Michael M. Haley, University of Oregon
Paul E. Laibinis, Massachusetts Institute of Technology
John Montgomery, Wayne State University
Catherine J. Murphy, University of South Carolina
Brooks Hart Pate, University of Virginia
David A. Shultz, North Carolina State University
Marc L. Snapper, Boston College
Michael Tsapatsis, University of Massachusetts Amherst
Keith A. Woerpel, University of California, Irvine
John L. Wood, Yale University
XuMu Zhang, The Pennsylvania State University

1999 

Scott M. Auerbach, University of Massachusetts Amherst
Carolyn R. Bertozzi, University of California, Berkeley
David E. Clemmer, Indiana University
John T. Fourkas, Boston College
C. Daniel Frisbie, University of Minnesota
Randall L. Halcomb, University of Colorado Boulder
Sharon Hammes-Schiffer, University of Notre Dame
James E. Hutchison, University of Oregon
Thomas Lectka, Johns Hopkins University
Raul Lobo, University of Delaware
Yi Lu, University of Illinois at Urbana-Champaign
Dimitrios Maroudas, University of California, Santa Barbara
Anne B. McCoy, Ohio State University
Dominic V. McGrath, University of Arizona
Amy S. Mullin, Boston University
Andrew M. Rappe, University of Pennsylvania
Daniel Romo, Texas A&M University
Daniel K. Schwartz, Tulane University
Yian Shi, Colorado State University
Peng George Wang, Wayne State University

2000 

Kristi S. Anseth, University of Colorado Boulder
Uwe H. F. Bunz, University of South Carolina
Geoffrey W. Coates, Cornell University
Timothy Deming, University of California, Santa Barbara
Deborah G. Evans, University of New Mexico
Michel R. Gagné, The University of North Carolina at Chapel Hill
Hilary A. Godwin, Northwestern University
Mark W. Grinstaff, Duke University
Marc A. Hillmyer, University of Minnesota
James L. Leighton, Columbia University
Jeffrey R. Long, University of California, Berkeley
Todd J. Martinez, University of Illinois at Urbana-Champaign
Scott J. Miller, Boston College
Milan Mrksich, The University of Chicago
John P. Toscano, Johns Hopkins University
, University of Pennsylvania
Thomas J. Wandless, Stanford University
James J. Watkins, University of Massachusetts Amherst

2001 

Philip Bevilacqua, The Pennsylvania State University
Vicki Colvin, Rice University
Jan Genzer, North Carolina State University
David Y. Gin, University of Illinois at Urbana-Champaign
Richard Hsung, University of Minnesota
Wenbin Lin, Brandeis University
Mark Lonergan, University of Oregon
Benjamin Miller, University of Rochester
Paul Nealey, University of Wisconsin-Madison
John Peters, Utah State University
Amy Rosenzweig, Northwestern University
Benjamin Schwartz, University of California, Los Angeles
Matthew Shair, Harvard University
Erik Sorensen, The Scripps Research Institute
Ross Widenhoefer, Duke University
Olaf G. Wiest, University of Notre Dame

2002 

Annelise E. Barron, Northwestern University
Peter A. Beal, The University of Utah
Jillian Buriak, Purdue University
Jeffrey D. Carbeck, Princeton University
Hongjie Dai, Stanford University
Michael W. Deem, University of California, Los Angeles
Robert M. Dickson, Georgia Institute of Technology
Theodore G. Goodson, Wayne State University
Jonas C. Peters, California Institute of Technology
David R. Reichman, Harvard University
Dalibor Sames, Columbia University
David S. Sholl, Carnegie Mellon University
Mark E. Tuckerman, New York University
Wilfred A. van der Donk, University of Illinois at Urbana-Champaign
Younan Xia, University of Washington

2003 

Catalina Achim, Carnegie Mellon University
Jianshu Cao, Massachusetts Institute of Technology
Paul Cremer, Texas A&M University
Michael J. Krische, University of Texas at Austin
Kelvin H. Lee, Cornell University
Christopher J. Lee, University of California, Los Angeles
Louis A. Lyon, Georgia Institute of Technology 
David MacMillan, California Institute of Technology 
Vijay S. Pande, Stanford University
Hongkun Park, Harvard University
Floyd E. Romesberg, The Scripps Research Institute
Shannon S. Stahl, University of Wisconsin–Madison
Suzanne Walker, Princeton University

2004 

Justin Du Bois, Stanford University
Pingyun Feng, University of California, Riverside
Neil L. Kelleher, University of Illinois at Urbana-Champaign
Sergey A. Kozmin, The University of Chicago
David R. Liu, Harvard University
Colin P. Nuckolls, Columbia University
Blake R. Peterson, The Pennsylvania State University 
Andrei Sanov, University of Arizona
Stanislav Shvartsman, Princeton University
Matthew Sigman, The University of Utah
Jennifer A. Swift, Georgetown University
Nils G. Walter, University of Michigan
Peidong Yang, University of California, Berkeley

2005 

Victor Batista, Yale University
Kristie Boering, University of California, Berkeley
Daniel Gamelin, University of Washington
Brian R. Gibney, Columbia University
Zhibin Guan, University of California, Irvine
Jason M. Haugh, North Carolina State University
Rustem F. Ismagilov, The University of Chicago
Christine D. Keating, The Pennsylvania State University
Shana O. Kelley, Boston College
Todd D. Krauss, University of Rochester
Yung-Ya Lin, University of California, Los Angeles
Janis Louie, The University of Utah
Daniel J. Mindiola, Indiana University
Brian Stoltz, California Institute of Technology
Marcus Weck, Georgia Institute of Technology
Xiaowei Zhuang, Harvard University

2006 

Heather C. Allen, Ohio State University
Paul Chirik, Cornell University
Patrick S. Daugherty, University of California, Santa Barbara
David H. Gracias, Johns Hopkins University
Chuan He, The University of Chicago
Paul J. Hergenrother, University of Illinois at Urbana-Champaign
Yoshitaka Ishii, University of Illinois at Chicago
Jeffrey S. Johnson, The University of North Carolina at Chapel Hill
James T.  Kindt, Emory University
Carsten Krebs, The Pennsylvania State University
Eric Meggers, University of Pennsylvania
Dong-Kyun Seo, Arizona State University
Alice Y. Ting, Massachusetts Institute of Technology
Orlin D. Velev, North Carolina State University
John P. Wolfe, University of Michigan

2007 

Helen Blackwell, University of Wisconsin–Madison
Frank L. H. Brown, University of California, Santa Barbara
Jeffrey M. Davis , University of Massachusetts Amherst
Ivan J. Dmochowski, University of Pennsylvania
Justin P. Gallivan, Emory University
David S. Ginger, University of Washington
Bartosz A. Grzybowski, Northwestern University
Jeffrey D. Hartgerink, Rice University
Efrosini Kokkoli, University of Minnesota
Gavin MacBeath, Harvard University
David A. Mazziotti, The University of Chicago
Sergey Nizkorodov, University of California, Irvine
Oleg V. Ozerov, Brandeis University
Raymond Schaak, The Pennsylvania State University
Michael Strano, Massachusetts Institute of Technology

2008 

Christopher Bielawski, University of Texas at Austin
Garnet K. Chan, Cornell University
Olafs Daugulis, University of Houston
Lincoln J. Lauhon, Northwestern University
Mohammad Movassaghi, Massachusetts Institute of Technology
Thuc-Quyen Nguyen, University of California, Santa Barbara
Garegin Papoian, The University of North Carolina at Chapel Hill
Theresa M. Reineke, Virginia Polytechnic Institute and State University
Justine P. Roth, Johns Hopkins University
Yi Tang, University of California, Los Angeles
Victor M.  Ugaz, Texas A&M University
Qian Wang, University of South Carolina
M. Christina White, University of Illinois at Urbana-Champaign
Haw Yang, University of California, Berkeley
Dongping Zhong, Ohio State University

2009 

Alán Aspuru-Guzik, Harvard University
Xi Chen, University of California, Davis 
Katherine Franz, Duke University
Christy Haynes, University of Minnesota
Alan F. Heyduk, University of California, Irvine
So Hirata, University of Florida
Laura Kaufman, Columbia University
Suljo Linic, University of Michigan
Richmond Sarpong, University of California, Berkeley 
Shu-ou Shan, California Institute of Technology 
Jeremy M. Smith, New Mexico State University
Todd M. Squires, University of California, Santa Barbara
Abraham Stroock, Cornell University
Paul Ryan Thompson, University of South Carolina

2010 

Kate Carroll, University of Michigan
Matthew Disney, University at Buffalo
Kevin Dorfman, University of Minnesota
Amar Flood, Indiana University
Jayne Garno, Louisiana State University
Song-i Han, University of California, Santa Barbara
Seogjoo Jang, Queens College, City University of New York
Benjamin McCall, University of Illinois at Urbana-Champaign
R. Mohan Sankaran, Case Western Reserve University 
Rachel A. Segalman, University of California, Berkeley 
Dmitri Talapin, The University of Chicago
Edward Valeev, Virginia Polytechnic Institute and State University
B. Jill Venton, University of Virginia
Tehshik Yoon, University of Wisconsin–Madison

2011 

Christine Aikens, Kansas State University
Ruben L. Gonzalez, Jr., Columbia University
John Herbert, Ohio State University
George Huber, University of Massachusetts Amherst
Rongchao Jin, Carnegie Mellon University
Kevin Kubarych, University of Michigan
So-Jung Park, University of Pennsylvania
Nathan Price, University of Illinois at Urbana-Champaign
Tobias Ritter, Harvard University
Herman Sintim, University of Maryland, College Park
Charles H. Sykes, Tufts University
Ting Xu, University of California, Berkeley
Wei You, The University of North Carolina at Chapel Hill

2012 

Adam Cohen, Harvard University
Greg Engel, The University of Chicago
Joshua S. Figueroa, University of California, San Diego
Seth B. Herzon, Yale University
Christopher Jaroniec, Ohio State University
Steven Little, University of Pittsburgh
Shih-Yuan Liu, University of Oregon
Christopher Love, Massachusetts Institute of Technology
Dustin Maly, University of Washington
Anne McNeil, University of Michigan
Valeria Molinero, The University of Utah
Celeste Nelson, Princeton University
William Noid, The Pennsylvania State University
Sarah Reisman, California Institute of Technology

2013 

Theodore A. Betley, Harvard University
Michelle C. Chang, University of California, Berkeley 
William Dichtel, Cornell University
Abigail Doyle, Princeton University
Neil K. Garg, University of California, Los Angeles
Thomas W. Hamann, Michigan State University
Mandë Holford, Hunter College of the City University of New York
Munira Khalil, University of Washington
Stephen Maldonado, University of Michigan
Thomas F. Miller, California Institute of Technology
Baron G. Peters, University of California, Santa Barbara
Charles M. Schroeder, University of Illinois at Urbana-Champaign
Corey R. J. Stephenson, Boston University

2014 

Theodor Agapie, California Institute of Technology 
Hal Alper, University of Texas at Austin
Paul Dauenhauer, University of Massachusetts Amherst
Nilay Hazari, Yale University
Ramesh Jasti, Boston University
Matthew Kanan, Stanford University
Elizabeth Nolan, Massachusetts Institute of Technology
Rodney Priestley, Princeton University
Khalid Salaita, Emory University
Jordan Schmidt, University of Wisconsin–Madison
Sara Skrabalak, Indiana University
Adam Wasserman, Purdue University
Emily Weiss, Northwestern University
Daniel Weix, University of Rochester
Michael Zdilla, Temple University

2015 

Emily Balskus, Harvard University
Shannon W.  Boettcher, University of Oregon
Jennifer Dionne, Stanford University
Joshua E. Goldberger, Ohio State University
André Hoelz, California Institute of Technology 
Michael C. Jewett, Northwestern University
Wei Min, Columbia University
Douglas Mitchell, University of Illinois Urbana-Champaign
David A. Nicewicz, The University of North Carolina at Chapel Hill
Bradley D. Olsen, Massachusetts Institute of Technology
Gary J. Patti, Washington University in St. Louis
Jennifer A. Prescher, University of California, Irvine
Joseph E. Subotnik, University of Pennsylvania

2016 

Andrew J.  Boydston, University of Washington
Luis M. Campos, Columbia University
William C. Chueh, Stanford University
Neal K. Devaraj, University of California, San Diego
Mircea Dincă, Massachusetts Institute of Technology
Naomi Ginsberg, University of California, Berkeley 
Aditya S. Khair, Carnegie Mellon University
Jared C. Lewis, The University of Chicago
Amanda J. Morris, Virginia Polytechnic Institute and State University
Eranda Nikolla, Wayne State University
Michael D. Pluth, University of Oregon
Nathaniel K. Szymczak, University of Michigan
Qiu Wang, Duke University

2017 

Chase L. Beisel, North Carolina State University
Brandi Cossairt, University of Washington
Jason M. Crawford, Yale University
Aaron P. Esser-Kahn, University of California, Irvine
Alison R. Fout, University of Illinois Urbana-Champaign
Randall H. Goldsmith, University of Wisconsin–Madison
Robert R. Knowles, Princeton University
Julius B. Lucks, Northwestern University
Thomas E. Markland, Stanford University
Christian M. Metallo, University of California, San Diego
Michelle O'Malley, University of California, Santa Barbara
William A. Tisdale, Massachusetts Institute of Technology
Guihua Yu, University of Texas at Austin

2018 

Alexander Barnes, Washington University in St. Louis
Amie K. Boal, The Pennsylvania State University
Abhishek Chatterjee, Boston College
Irene A. Chen, University of California, Santa Barbara
Francesco A. Evangelista, Emory University
Danna Freedman, Northwestern University 
Catherine L. Grimes, University of Delaware
John B. Matson, Virginia Polytechnic Institute and State University
Kang-Kuen Ni, Harvard University
Corinna S. Schindler, University of Michigan
Mohammad R.  Seyedsayamdost, Princeton University
Mikhail G. Shapiro, California Institute of Technology
Matthew D. Shoulders, Massachusetts Institute of Technology

2019 

Tianning Diao, New York University
Bryan C. Dickinson, The University of Chicago
Keary M. Engle, The Scripps Research Institute
Renee R. Frontiera, University of Minnesota
Garret M. Miyake, Colorado State University
Timothy R. Newhouse, Yale University
Amish J. Patel, University of Pennsylvania
Dipali G. Sashital, Iowa State University
Natalia Shustova, University of South Carolina
Christopher Uyeda, Purdue University
Timothy A. Wencewicz, Washington University in St. Louis
Jenny Y. Yang, University of California, Irvine

2020 

Ou Chen, Brown University
, Duke University
, The University of North Carolina at Chapel Hill
, University of Rochester
, University of California, Berkeley
Katherine Mirica, Dartmouth College
, Arizona State University
Alison R. H. Narayan, University of Michigan
Gabriela Schlau-Cohen, Massachusetts Institute of Technology
Alexander M. Spokoyny, University of California, Los Angeles
Steven D. Townsend, Vanderbilt University
, The University of Chicago
, Harvard University

2021 

, The University of Chicago
, The University of Texas at Austin
, University of California, Santa Barbara
, University of Maryland, College Park
Julia Kalow, Northwestern University
Markita del Carpio Landry, University of California, Berkeley
, Cornell University
, Yale University
, Massachusetts Institute of Technology
David Olson, University of California, Davis
, Brown University
, University of California, San Francisco
Luisa Whittaker-Brooks, University of Utah
, Lehigh University
, University of Massachusetts Amherst
, University of California, San Diego

2022

, University of California, Los Angeles
, University of Illinois at Urbana-Champaign
, Princeton University
, University of Oregon
, North Carolina State University
, University of Chicago
, Dartmouth College
, Harvard University
, Northeastern University
, California Institute of Technology
, University of Colorado, Boulder
, Massachusetts Institute of Technology
, Stanford University
, University of Washington
, Johns Hopkins University
, University of California, Davis
, The Pennsylvania State University
, Yale University

See also 

 List of chemistry awards

References

External links 

 Dreyfus Foundation Website

Chemistry awards
Awards established in 1970